Bnois King (born January 21, 1943) (pronounced "buh-noise") is a Texas Blues and Jazz guitar player, vocalist, and composer.  He most often played guitar and rhythm guitar, and acted as the main vocalist and original song writer for the Smokin' Joe Kubek Band, touring and equally billed with Kubek after 1997.

Early life and career
King was born January 21, 1943, in Delhi, Louisiana, a small town thirty miles east of Monroe, Louisiana. He had seven brothers and two sisters.  King started playing guitar at the early age of eight when he found an unused guitar in his grandmother's closet and started picking out notes.  He attended Boley High School, which lacked a music teacher until his final year there.  Up until then, the few songs he could play he played by ear.  While still in high school, James Moody, the owner and bandleader of a 20-piece big band out of New Orleans (called "The New Sounds"), took him under his wing and gave him his first paying gig, for which King made $15. Once King realized he could make money playing guitar on stage is when he reports "...I really got serious" about playing guitar."

After high school, King traveled to west Texas (Amarillo), Colorado and Oklahoma, and finally settled in north Texas (Wichita Falls) while trying to break into the music industry and make a career from it. Struggling at first in the industry, King sometimes found himself playing at carnival side shows or working 'straight jobs' (such as detailing cars at a dealership).  King was, however, again performing regularly in Dallas and Fort Worth by the late 70s, usually playing with jazz bands. playing with Big Joe Williams along with other local talent, often out of a local Dallas blues spot, Poor David's Pub.

It was in Dallas that King met, and thereafter periodically teamed up with, electric blues guitarist Smokin' Joe Kubek, starting in 1989.

Playing style
King was exposed to gospel music at an early age, but leaned more towards the blues and (especially) jazz, which he listened to on the radio while growing up.  He started playing blues covers when still in high school, but continued mostly playing with jazz oriented bands afterward—until he met Kubek.  While the rock-influenced Kubek played in an aggressive style, King had been heavily jazz-influenced and embraced a more relaxed playing style.  They got along well, however, and two repeatedly partnered up after 1989.  Other blues artists, such as Sam Myers would sit in with the group for performances.

Career work with Kubek
Building a repertoire from old, neglected blues genre songs (such as from the likes of Jimmy Reed and Freddie King), the duo found a ready audience for Bnois King's laid-back vocalizations and rhythm guitar playing, and Kubek's hard-playing blues style.  At this time, King discovered other talents he didn't realize he possessed: singing and song writing.  King hadn't really sung much on stage until he teamed up with Kubek.  King said about it: "We needed a singer so I sang... and every time I did the crowds went wild. We needed songs so I wrote about things that happened to me, to people I knew..."  Audiences enjoyed the blending of the two's very different playing styles.

The duo released their first collaborative album in 1991, a Texas blues album entitled Steppin' Out Texas Style.  The duo's run came to an end October 2015 with Kubek's death.

Production companies
King and Kubek originally signed up with Rounder Select-Bullseye when they published their first joint album in 1991.  That relationship worked until the late 1990s, when King started receiving equal billing with Kubek after 1997.  The two were signed with Blind Pig Records from 2002 to 2007; and again in 2015.  In addition, King has been signed and promoted (as both a solo act and as a duo along with Kubek) to Alligator Records, Delta Groove, and Simitar Records for various past productions.

Album discography

Solo efforts and contributions

The Smokin' Joe Kubek Band, featuring Bnois King 
 Steppin' Out Texas Style (1991), Rounder Select-Bullseye
 Chain Smokin' Texas Style (1992), 
 Texas Cadillac (1994), Bullseye Blues/Rounder
 Cryin' for the Moon (1995), Bullseye Blues/Rounder
 Got My Mind Back (1996), Rounder Select
 Lone Star Blues (October 1997), EasyDisc/Rounder
 Take Your Best Shot (1998), Rounder Select 
 Bite Me! (2000), Bullseye Blues/Rounder
 Served Up Texas Style: The Best of the Smokin' Joe Kubek Band (2005), Bullseye Blues/Rounder

Compilations with Kubek 
 Texas Blues Guitar (June 1997), EasyDisc/Rounder
 Blues Guitar Duels (August 1998), EasyDisc/Rounder
 New Blues Classics (2010), Bullseye Blues/Rounder

Duo albums with Smokin' Joe Kubek 
 Axe Man (December 1991), Double Trouble Records
 Roadhouse Research (2003), Blind Pig
 Show Me The Money (2004), Blind Pig
 My Heart's In Texas (2006), Blind Pig; (live recording, from J&J Blues Bar, Ft. Worth, Texas)
 Blood Brothers (2008), Alligator Records
 Have Blues, Will Travel (2010), Alligator Records
 Close to the Bone: Unplugged (2011), Delta Groove Music / Delta Groove Productions / Jazzhaus
 Road Dog's Life (2013), Delta Groove Music / Delta Groove Productions / Jazzhaus
 Fat Man's Shine Parlor< (2015), Blind Pig

References

External links
 Official website
 Smokin' Joe Kubek & Bnois King; Blind Pig Records website
 Artist Biography – Bnois King
 Credits; at AllMusic.com

1943 births
American blues guitarists
American male guitarists
People from Delhi, Louisiana
Texas blues musicians
Living people
20th-century American guitarists
21st-century American guitarists
Guitarists from Texas
20th-century American male musicians
21st-century American male musicians